The Macau University of Science and Technology (M.U.S.T.,) is a private university founded in 2000 at Taipa, Macau, China.

M.U.S.T. is acknowledged by Macau Education and Youth Development Bureau. It offers courses instructed in English, Chinese, Portuguese, and Spanish.  As of September 2021, there are more than 16,000 students studying at the university, including approximately 6,200 master and doctoral students and 10,500 undergraduate students.

The Ministry of Science and Technology of China approved the university's application to use the names the State Key Laboratory of Quality Research in Chinese Medicines and the State Key Laboratory of Lunar and Planetary Sciences for its two laboratories. The university is ranked 250–300 in the Times Higher Education World University Rankings 2020.

History 

Academic Units 

 Faculty of Innovation Engineering

The Faculty of Information Technology (FI) was established in 2000, as one of the first four faculties in M.U.S.T. Since 2005, faculty members have completed many research projects, with additional some projects on-going, all funded by the Science and Technology Development Fund of Macao. Areas include computer graphics and visualization, computer networking and communication, decision support technology, and knowledge engineering. The Faculty provides academic degrees including bachelor's degrees in the areas of Computer Technology and Application, Electronic Information Technology, and Software Technology and Application, Master and Doctoral Degrees in the areas of Computer Technology and Application, Electronic Information Technology, and Space Information Technology.

In March 2022, the Faculty has renamed the Faculty of Innovation Engineering (FIE).

 School of Business

Established in 2000, School of Business (MSB) is one of the first four faculties in the Macau University of Science and Technology. The MSB is divided into three departments which are Department of Finance and Accounting, Department of Management, and Department of Decision Sciences.

 Faculty of Law

The Faculty of Law was established in March 2000. The Faculty has established the Research Center for Arbitration and Dispute Resolution and The Legal Practice and Education Center.
And the Faculty has created the programs of Bachelor of Laws(LLB), Master of Laws, Juris Master, Master of Laws in Criminal Justice, Master of International Economic and Commercial Law, Master of International Arbitration and Doctor of Laws (Ph.D.) in 9 majors.

 Faculty of Chinese Medicine

The Faculty of Chinese Medicine (FC) was established in 2000. At present, the Faculty has become the only higher education institution that has a complete educational curriculum system of Chinese Medicine in Macau. At present, the Faculty provides academic degrees including bachelor's degrees of Traditional Chinese Medicine and Pharmacy in Chinese Medicine, Master and Doctoral Degrees of Traditional Chinese Medicine, Chinese Medicines and Integrated Traditional Chinese & Western Medicine, and postdoctoral research workstations etc.

 Faculty of Hospitality and Tourism Management

Faculty of Hospitality and Tourism Management (FHTM), formerly known as Faculty of International Tourism, was founded in 2003.

 Faculty of Humanities and Arts

The Faculty of Humanities and Arts is the third largest faculty in the university. The faculty offers the Bachelor of Arts in Journalism and Communication (BAJC), and the Bachelor of Arts in Art Design (BAAD), it also offers the Doctor of Philosophy in Communication, Doctor of Philosophy in Design and the Master of Arts in communication, Master of Design.

 Faculty of Medicine

The Faculty of Health Sciences is officially renamed as the Faculty of Medicine in March 2019, offering the first and only Bachelor of Medicine and Bachelor of Surgery course in Macau. The Faculty of Medicine has established the Center for Continuing Medical and Health Education, which provides various training courses.

 School of Pharmacy

School of Pharmacy is a teaching unit of pharmacy. It aims to cultivate Macau pharmaceutical talents, improve Macao drug research and development capabilities, and provides a new pasture for developing leading pharmaceutical talents for China and the world.

 University International College

The University International College (UIC) was established 2010, focusing on providing degree programs and non-degree programs.  It currently offers a master's degree program entitled Master of Teaching Chinese as a Foreign Language and short-term training courses related to Chinese (Mandarin) language and an IELTS preparation course.

 Department of General Education

The Department of General Education (DGE) has six general studies programs: Chinese, English, Mathematics, General Education, Physical Education, and Pre-University Program. DGE offers excellent general studies courses, supporting the entire undergraduate program of Macau University of Science and Technology.

 School of Liberal Arts

Formerly known as The School of Continuing Studies and renamed in September 2020, the School of Liberal Arts (SLA) was established in 2003.

Campus
There are convenience stores, bank centers, student restaurant, teaching restaurant, coffee corner, computer store, physical development center, an Olympic-standard track and field stadium and gymnasium, indoor stadium and tennis court facilities in the campus. The University Hospital is located in the campus.

Block K is the International School of Macao.

Library 
Macau University of Science and Technology Library was founded in the year 2000 at the same time with the university. The total amount of current collection is more than 1.7 million pieces, which include 320 thousand books, 60,000 journals (including full-text electronic journals), 1.8 thousand newspapers, 1.3 million e-books, 9 million digital dissertations, 110 electronic databases, more than 7 thousand multimedia resources. The Library is committed to the development of collections and building resource sharing relationships with various libraries in great China. The National Library of China, Peking University Library, China Academic Humanities and Social Sciences Library (CASHL), China Academic Library and Information System (CALIS), the Chinese University of Hong Kong Libraries, National Taiwan University Library and many other libraries. M.U.S.T. Library is also developing a long-term ongoing project by the name Global Mapping of Macao (GMOM). Beginning in 2013 it aims to develop a special collection not only on maps but also atlas, plans, charts, landscapes, drawings, etc. – by purchase or facsimile – with special focus on Macao. The project has three facets: the expansion of the global history of Macao as a research area; the development of a special collection on maps about Macao by purchasing or facsimileing; and the provision of a database on maps of Macao for research and public education. M.U.S.T. Library has therefore been forming protocols with important international libraries such as the Biblioteca Apostolica Vaticana, Bodleian Library, Harvard University, Library of Congress among others, and looking to keep the list growing.

Student dormitory
The university owns five dormitories.

Student restaurant
The student restaurant is located on the ground floor of Block E Activity Centre and its seating capacity is over 300. And the Café is located at the lobby of Block C Academic Building.

Medical service
The medical service of M.U.S.T. is fully supported by the University Hospital which is a hospital located within the campus.

Research

State Key Laboratories
 State Key Laboratory of Quality Research in Chinese Medicines
The Ministry of Science and Technology of China approved the university's application to use the name State Key Laboratory of Quality Research in Chinese Medicine on January 25, 2011.

 State Key Laboratory of Lunar and Planetary Science
The Ministry of Science and Technology of China approved the university's application to use the name State Key Laboratory of Lunar and Planetary Science on October 8, 2018.

Joint Laboratories
 Macao Media Research Center (partner with Fudan University)
 Macao Ocean Development Research Center (partner with Ocean University of China)
 Macao Center for Studies of Intellectual Property Rights (partner with Zhongnan University of Economics and Law)
 Joint Laboratory for Translational Cancer Research of Chinese Medicine (partner with Guangzhou University of Chinese Medicine)

Nobel Prizewinner laboratory
 Dr. Neher's Biophysics Laboratory of Chinese Medicine 
Macau's first Nobel Prize Winner Laboratory “Biophysical Laboratory for Chinese Medicine” provides a novel platform to study the cardiovascular diseases, neuro-disorders and immune related diseases using the latest techniques of biophysics, especially to further clarify the molecular and cellular mechanisms in the complicated system of Traditional Chinese Medicine.

Others
 Space Science Institute / Lunar and Planetary Science Laboratory
Macau University of Science and Technology established the Space Science Institute (SSI) in 2011. The Lunar and Planetary Science Laboratory was formed in 2014 as a co-laboratory of Chinese Academy of Sciences Key Laboratory of Lunar and Deep Space Exploration. Working closely with its partner laboratory, the Laboratory pursues academic research with a focus on scientific results derived from China's Lunar and Deep Space Exploration Program. 
 Institute for Social and Cultural Research
The Institute for Social and Cultural Research (ISCR) was established in December 2010, which is a key research institute in Macau University of Science and Technology.
 Macau Environmental Research Institute
Macau Environmental Research Institute (MERI) was established in September, 2015, which is one of the key research institutes in Macau University of Science and Technology.
 Macau Institute of Smart City
Macau Institute of Smart City was officially established on September 26, 2016, by Macau University of Science and Technology to provide a coordinated platform to promote Macau as a smart city.
 Academy of Film
Academy of Film was established in 2015 as the first research and teaching institute of cinematic arts in Macau. The academy was under the Faculty of Humanities and arts, which aims at establishing an international platforms of “communication, research and service”.
 Macau Institute for Applied Research in Medicine and Health
 The Institution for Sustainable Development
 Macau Institute of Systems Engineering
 Macau Academy of Research Economy of Chinese Medicine
 Macau Architecture & Urban Planning Institute
 Macau Financial Innovation Research Center
 Research Centre on Arbitration & Alternative Dispute Resolution
 Macau Research Center for International Standard of Chinese Medicines
 Macau Media Research Center

Rankings

Ranking of M.U.S.T.
251-300 in the Times Higher Education World University Rankings 2022
36 in the Times Higher Education Asia University Rankings 2022
601-700 in the Academic Ranking of World Universities 2021
581-590 in the QS World University Rankings 2023 
205 in the QS Asian University Rankings 2022
17 in the Ranking of Top Universities in Greater China (Mainland China, Taiwan, Hong Kong and Macau) 2020 - ShanghaiRanking's Academic Ranking

Foundation
Macau University of Science and Technology Foundation (M.U.S.T. Foundation), being a non-profit organization, is recognized as a legal entity of public interest by the Macau Government. Its aims are to develop human talents, promote academic scholarship, facilitate cultural exchanges, and to foster society advancement stemming from excellent teaching, research and community services.

The organization structure of the foundation consists of a Board of Trustees, an Executive Board and a Control Board. The members of each of these constituted bodies are drawn from the elites of Macao political, business, and/or professional circles. The foundation oversees the following three distinctive institutions: 
 Macau University of Science and Technology
 University Hospital
 The International School of Macao

See also
 List of universities and colleges in Macau

References

External links 

 
GMOM (old maps of Macau)

 
Taipa
Educational institutions established in 2000
2000 establishments in Macau
Traditional Chinese medicine